Témiscouata-sur-le-Lac Water Aerodrome  is located on Lake Témiscouata adjacent to Témiscouata-sur-le-Lac, Quebec, Canada.

References

Registered aerodromes in Bas-Saint-Laurent
Seaplane bases in Quebec